Rolla is a city in, and the county seat of, Phelps County, Missouri, United States.  The population in the 2020 United States Census was 19,943.  Rolla is located approximately midway between St. Louis and Springfield along I-44. The Rolla, Mo Micropolitan Statistical area consists of Phelps County, Missouri.

It is the home of the Missouri University of Science and Technology, well known, both nationally and internationally, for its many engineering departments and computer science department.

The headquarters of the Mark Twain National Forest is located in Rolla.  The city is also within the Ozark Highlands American Viticultural Area, with vineyards established first by Italian immigrants to the area.

History

The first European-American settlers in Phelps County arrived in the early 19th century, working as farmers and iron workers along the local rivers, such as the Meramec, the Gasconade, and the Little Piney.  In 1842, John Webber built the first house in what became the City of Rolla. Nine years later, railroad contractor Edmund Ward Bishop, considered to be the founder of Rolla, settled in the area. The state officially established Rolla as a town in 1858.

Two stories account for how Rolla was named. One story, widely regarded as a folk legend, and acknowledged as such by the Phelps County Historical Society, arises from the competition between Rolla and neighboring Dillon, Missouri, to be designated the county seat. When Rolla was made the county seat in 1861, the residents of Dillon, having lost a round, were allowed to choose the name of the new city and named it Rolla, after a good-for-nothing hunting dog.

The more widely accepted story came from a citizens' meeting about naming the town. Webber was said to prefer the name Hardscrabble (which was used to describe the soils in the region) and Bishop pushed for the name Phelps Center. George Coppedge, representing new settlers from North Carolina, wanted to name the community after Raleigh. Bishop broke the three-way tie by agreeing with Coppedge as long as the name was spelled properly for the region, Rolla.

With numerous settlers from the South, many residents of Rolla leaned toward the Confederacy during the American Civil War and the town was taken by Union forces in June 1861. They built two minor forts — Fort Wyman and Fort Dette — during their occupation.  Rolla was also the location of Camp Glover and Camp Davies.  From 1863 to 1865, Rolla was the regimental headquarters of the 5th Missouri State Militia.

For most of its history, Rolla has served as a transportation and trading center. It was the original terminus of the St. Louis-San Francisco Railway, colloquially known as the "Frisco Line". Today, the BNSF Railway directly runs through the town.

Rolla was also a regular stop along U.S. Route 66, as it is almost located exactly halfway between the larger cities of St. Louis and Springfield.  Today, Interstate 44, U.S. Route 63, and Route 72 all run through Rolla.

Geography
Running through the city is the divide line that separates the vast Missouri watershed (via the Little Piney and the Gasconade) from the substantially smaller Meremec watershed (via the Bourbeuse).

Climate
Rolla has a humid subtropical climate. The Köppen Climate Classification subtype for this climate is "Cfa".

Demographics

2010 census
As of the census of 2010, there were 19,559 people, 7,574 households, and 3,765 families living in the city. The racial makeup of the city was 86.71% White, 4.11% Black or African American, 0.43% Native American, 5.70% Asian, 0.09% Native Hawaiian or Pacific Islander, 0.41% from other races, and 2.56% from two or more races. Hispanic or Latino of any race were 2.62% of the population.

There were 7,574 households, of which 25.7% had children under the age of 18 living with them, 35.2% were married couples living together, 10.7% had a female householder with no husband present, 3.8% had a male householder with no wife present, and 50.3% were non-families. 36.4% of all households were made up of individuals, and 10.8% had someone living alone who was 65 years of age or older. The average household size was 2.24 and the average family size was 2.90.

The median age in the city was 26.2 years. 18.2% of residents were under the age of 18; 29.4% were between the ages of 18 and 24; 23.7% were from 25 to 44; 17.1% were from 45 to 64; and 11.6% were 65 years of age or older. The gender makeup of the city was 55.0% male and 45.0% female.

2000 census
As of the census of 2000, there were 16,367 people, 6,514 households, and 3,543 families living in the city. The population density was 1,448.7 per square mile (559.2/km). There were 7,221 housing units at an average density of 639.2 per square mile (246.7/km). The racial makeup of the city was 89.2% White, 2.92% African American, 0.46% Native American, 4.6% Asian, 0.12% Pacific Islander, 0.73% from other races, and 1.69% from two or more races. Hispanic or Latino of any race were 1.72% of the population.

There were 6,514 households, out of which 26.2% had children under the age of 18 living with them, 41.0% were married couples living together, 10.6% had a female householder with no husband present, and 45.6% were non-families. 35.9% of all households were made up of individuals, and 11.4% had someone living alone who was 65 years of age or older. The average household size was 2.20 and the average family size was 2.88.

In the city, the population was spread out, with 20.1% under the age of 18, 25.3% from 18 to 24, 25.2% from 25 to 44, 16.4% from 45 to 64, and 13.0% who were 65 years of age or older. The median age was 28 years. For every 100 females, there were 112.1 males. For every 100 females age 18 and over, there were 114.2 males.

The median income for a household in the city was $26,479, and the median income for a family was $38,975. Males had a median income of $31,861 versus $19,625 for females. The per capita income for the city was $15,916. About 13.8% of families and 22.0% of the population were below the poverty line, including 22.3% of those under age 18 and 13.8% of those age 65 or over.

Economy
Royal Canin, a major manufacturer of dog and cat food, operates a dry food plant in Rolla. 

Small-engine manufacturer Briggs & Stratton operated a major plant in Rolla from 1996 to 2007.

Brewer Science, a nationwide manufacturer of semiconductors, is headquartered in Rolla.

Hartmann North America started production at a headquarters site in Rolla in July 2017 after the Denmark-based Brødrene Hartmann decided to open such a site in the US. Hartmann is a leading manufacturer of molded-fiber egg packaging, a manufacturer of fruit packaging in South America, and a manufacturer of machinery for producing food packaging. Hartmann used and later expanded the former Briggs & Stratton plant for their Rolla facility.

Education
Rolla is home of the Rolla Bulldogs at Rolla High School.

Rolla is an important center for state and federal education and research in science and technology. It is the home of the Missouri University of Science and Technology (Missouri S&T), founded as the Missouri School of Mines and Metallurgy in 1870 and known as the University of Missouri–Rolla (UMR) from 1964 through 2007. Missouri S&T is well known for its engineering and computer science departments. In addition, the US Geological Survey operates a large regional facility with various centers: the National Geospatial Technical Operations Center III, the Missouri Water Science Center, the Mid-Continent Geographic Science Center, National Spatial Data Infrastructure Partnership Office Liaisons, and the Rolla Science Information and Library Services office.

Rolla has a lending library, the Rolla Public Library.

Media
Rolla and surrounding communities are served by a daily newspaper, The Rolla Daily News.  KUMR, KRTE-FM KFLW, KFBD, KTTR, KMOZ, KTTR-FM, KZNN, KXMO, and KKID are the local commercial radio stations. KMST (FM) is the Public Radio station and KMNR FM is the student radio station of the Missouri University of Science and Technology.

Notable places

 National Bank of Rolla Building, National Register of Historic Places
 Phelps County Courthouse, National Register of Historic Places
 Phelps County Jail, National Register of Historic Places
 Rolla Ranger Station Historic District, National Register of Historic Places
 Headquarters, Rolla Division of the US Bureau of Mines, National Register of Historic Places
 Missouri University of Science and Technology has a half-scale Stonehenge replica built from solid granite located on campus, as well as an astronomical observatory and an operational nuclear reactor, which was the state's first.
 Missouri Department of Natural Resources, Division of Geology and Land Survey and Ed Clark Museum of Missouri Geology.
 United States Geological Survey

Notable people

Sister cities
 Sondershausen, Thuringia, Germany

References

External links
 

 City of Rolla
 Rolla Area Chamber of Commerce
 Rolla Times
 The Rolla Daily News
 Historic maps of Rolla in the Sanborn Maps of Missouri Collection at the University of Missouri

 
1858 establishments in Missouri
Cities in Phelps County, Missouri
County seats in Missouri
Cities in Missouri